A weizza or weikza is an immortal, supernatural wizarding mystic in Buddhism in Burma associated with esoteric and occult practices such as recitation of spells, samatha, mysticism and alchemy. The goal of this practice is to achieve immortality and the state of the Weizza, who awaits the appearance of the future Buddha, Metteya.

Weikza practices are less common than merit-making practices or vipassanā meditation. During the socialist era from 1962 to 1988, Ne Win banned secret weizza associations, weizza magazines and literature, and portrayals of weizza from films and other media, considering them a threat to his regime. Weizza have made a resurgence since 1988, particularly following the abolition of the national censorship board in 2012. Burmese pagodas often house weizza shrines, where they are venerated for their spiritual purity and their devotion to those in need. Weizza teachers have also amassed hundreds of thousands of followers using social media.

Etymology

The word weizza (ဝိဇ္ဇာ) comes from the Pali word vijja, which means “knowledge” or “wisdom.”

Weizzas in the historical tradition

Aside from epigraphs, there are no local Indic or vernacular compositions that have been securely dated to pre-Pagan Burma. However, there are some later attributions of texts that were written during the first millennium. One such example is the Kappālaṅkāra, a vijjādhara ("weikza") text said to have been written by the bhikkhu Uttamasīri during the first century CE. The text survives in an 18th-century Pali-Burmese nissaya version (which attributes the text to Uttamasīri in its colophon) compiled by Taungdwin Sayadaw Ñaṇābhidhammālaṅkāra.

In Myanmar, there are two classes of wizards; the sôns and the weizzas. The former are considered a bane to society, while the latter spend their days helping the common folk and undoing the curses brought upon by the sôns. The commonly known weizzas known today first appeared during the Konbaung dynasty, when Bo Bo Aung, a monk in Sagaing, discovered manuscripts revealing the secrets of weizza. However, many recognized weizzas today come from before the Konbaung dynasty. This was the last dynasty to rule Burma before colonial rule. Before weizzas, there were the Zawgyi (ဇော်ဂျီ) and Yawgi (ယောဂီ). The Zawgyi were wizards who were written about in Burmese literature, while the Yawgi were Buddhist yogis who lead ascetic lives and wore brown robes. They followed eight to tern precepts of Buddhism, whereas most laymen follow five.

Weizza orders
Weizzas are divided into four major orders:
 The Pyada Weizza, who work with mercury
 The Than Weizza, who work with iron
 The Se Weizza, who specialize in medicine
 The In Weizza, who specialize in yantra signs and squares

Among these, the Than and In are considered the most powerful. The Pyada Weizza, or Mercury Wizards, also study alchemy in order to produce gold and silver from more common metals. The Than Weizzas are considered by their followers as masters of not only their subject, but also as medical advisors.

Purported abilities
Among their powers, weizzas possess the ability to see past lives, see and hear things that are far away, read minds, teleport, dive into the earth, walk on water, and be in multiple places simultaneously. Powerful practitioners of the weizzas’ way are purported to live for centuries, even choosing the time of their next reincarnation. The In Weizza, who work with cabalistic squares, use one's birth date and time to create powerful charms and spells. In The Burman, Sir J. George Scott described some squares and charms so powerful that they could set a house ablaze. Others, engraved in stone and embedded in one's skin, would prevent drowning. Merely scratching an in in a house or tree could cause lightning to strike it.

Tools of the trade

Weizza grimoires
Two traditional manuscripts contain rudimentary guidelines on the practices of weizzas: the Bedin and the Deittôn. The latter is a book on astrology and cabalistic science. Containing just basic principles of the art of weizzas, the teachings in these texts are often surpassed by the weizza’s own individual study and personal advancement. However, these books were once complete, many having been burned by religious zealots in the time of the last Buddha. The remains were spared from the fire by Devadatta, the cousin of Shin Gautama. Devadatta was always plotting against Shin Gautama, so he saved portions of the old science. Thus, this style of learning is looked upon with suspicion by many religious folk.

Medical remedies

Weizza prescriptions may be composed of chili powder, cloves, and ginger for fevers to earth-oil infused with seeds, bark, leaves, flowers, roots, and minerals. Weizzas are specially adept with pills and powders, which are carried in bright red phials made of heavily scented bamboo. These ingredients are gathered with attention to the phases of the moon and placement of the constellations. Another potent ingredient in the weizza's cabinet is meteoric stones, which can be gathered within three days of lightning striking a piece of earth and are used as ophthalmic medicine. Weizzas seldom use liquids in their practice of medicine.

Medical philosophies

Two schools of thought exist in weizza medicine:

 The datsayās, whose primary focus is on diets

The beindawsayās, who work with potent drugs

In both schools, the human body is divided into four elements (dats): earth (patawi dat), fire (tezaw dat), water (apaw dat), and air (wayaw dat). Some practitioners also include ether (akatha), though this element is disregarded by doctors.

Earth: the flesh, bones, hair, intestines, etc.

Fire: eating, drinking, chewing, and licking

Water: the fat, blood, bile, spittle, mucus, etc.

Air: the six kinds of winds

Modern perception of weizzas
Weizza following still exists in Myanmar, though the socialist government during the Ne Win era suppressed this ideology. The former government forbade the publication of weizza materials and selling of weizza prints, which are popular in household altars. Even so, weizza followers abound. There exist exclusive groups of weizza devotees called gaing. These groups follow a set of tenets, are headed by a charismatic leader, and center their devotion on one or more weizza saints.

Notable weizzas

Bo Bo Aung
Bo Min Gaung
Kyaikhtisaung Sayadaw
Yatkansin Taung Sayadaw
Setkya Mintha

See also
Rishi
Sadhu
Sennin
Vidyadhara
Xian

References

Bibliography